David Cortez Clowney IV (born July 8, 1985) is a former American football wide receiver. He was drafted by the Green Bay Packers in the fifth round of the 2007 NFL Draft. He played college football at Virginia Tech.

Clowney spent the bulk of his four year NFL career as a player for the New York Jets.

Early years 
Clowney attended Atlantic Community High School in Delray Beach, Florida. While there he was an honorable mention Class 5A All-State selection as a senior. He lettered four seasons as a receiver and safety for.  Clowney was named to the All-Palm Beach County team as published by the Palm Beach Post. He made one of the season's biggest plays, a 99-yard touchdown catch against Blanche Ely High School in the regional finals. Clowney totaled 25 catches for 576 yards and a county-best ten touchdowns. He returned three kicks for 245 yards and two touchdowns. Clowney caught three passes for 120 yards and two touchdowns in a game against Wellington High School. He caught 39 passes his junior season.

Clowney was also a sprinter on the track team. He was a state finalist in the 200 meter dash and a regional finalist in the 100 meter dash. He also lettered two years as a guard in basketball.

College career 
While at Virginia Tech, Clowney majored in Apparel, Housing and Resource Management. Clowney earned a graduate degree in Justice Administration and Public Service at the College of Saint Elizabeth in New Jersey in 2011. As Well as a third degree / second Masters Degree with an M.B.A. from the University of Miami

Freshman (2003) 
In 2003, Clowney played in 12 games. He had five receptions for 67 yards and a score for the season. He started his career catching two passes for 37 yards against the University of Central Florida, making a 27-yard touchdown catch from Marcus Vick late in the game.

Sophomore (2004) 
In 2004, Clowney played in 12 games, catching 20 passes for 263 yards and two touchdowns. He had a seven-yard reception against the University of Southern California. Clowney did not play against Western Michigan. He caught a 38-yard pass on the final drive against North Carolina State. Clowney earned his first collegiate start against Florida A&M, finishing the game with two catches for 34 yards and a 26-yard kickoff return. He recorded a 34-yard touchdown catch at Georgia Tech. Clowney tied his career high with four catches at University of Miami for 54 yards, he also had a 19-yard kickoff return. He was given the Frank O. Moseley Award, awarded to the top offensive hustler, following spring practice. Recorded a 450-pound back squat, a 36-inch vertical jump and a 4.33 40-yard dash in spring testing.

Junior (2005) 
Clowney hurt his hand in the latter part of spring, 2005, which somewhat limited his playing time on the field.

In 2005, David Clowney led the Hokies in receptions (34), receiving yards (619), and was second in average yards per catch (18.2). David played in all 13 games for Virginia Tech and started 12 of them. Unfortunately, even with a productive year, he only recorded 3 touchdown receptions. Clowney got off to a fast start by catching the game winning 19-yard touchdown pass from Marcus Vick in the season opener at NC State. David finished the season opener with 3 receptions for 30 yards and a touchdown. During Virginia Tech's second game against Duke in Durham, NC, David had 3 receptions for 62 yards and a touchdown. The Hokies' third game on their schedule would also be their first home game of their 2005 campaign against Ohio. Clowney started off great by making a 52-yard grab, but eventually ended the game with only 2 catches for 57 yards. In the next two games, home against Georgia Tech and at West Virginia, Clowney would record the same exact stat sheet with 3 catches for 47 yards. While facing Marshall, he recorded a 48-yard touchdown catch and finished the game with 2 catches for 56 yards and 1 touchdown. Although David would not score another touchdown for the remainder of the season, against Maryland, he had 3 receptions and would also set his 2005 game-high receiving yardage with 76. The following week versus Boston College, Clowney remained a target with 3 receptions for 58 yards. While facing their rival, Miami, Virginia Tech's offense was completely shut down and David only came away with 1 catch for 22 yards. He improved, following the Hokies' first loss of the season, by recording 3 catches for 42 yards at Virginia. Even though Virginia Tech relied on their rushing attack to defeat North Carolina, Clowney was their most productive receiver with 2 receptions for 18 yards. In the ACC Championship game, with a loss against Florida State, Clowney recorded 4 catches for 35 yards. Virginia Tech played Louisville on January 2, 2006 in the 2006 Gator Bowl. David led the team in receiving yards and made 2 catches for 69 yards including a career-long 54-yard reception. Clocking a 4.28 40 yard dash time while at Virginia Tech

Senior (2006) 
In 2006, Clowney played in 12 games, made 34 receptions for 424 yards, average 12.5 yards per reception, with a season long of 60 yards. He also carried the ball one time for a loss of five yards. He also returned two kick offs for a total of 44 yards, with a long of 24 yards.

Combine Tests 
 40 yard dash = 4.35 seconds
 10 yard dash = 1.57 seconds
 20 yard short shuttle = 4.15 seconds
 Vertical Jump = 40.5inches

Professional career

Green Bay Packers 
Clowney was selected in the fifth round (157th overall) of the 2007 NFL Draft by the Green Bay Packers.

New York Jets

2007 
Clowney was traded and signed by the New York Jets on October 3, 2007.

2008 
In the 2008 preseason game Clowney led all receivers with four receptions for 163 yards and two touchdowns. He finished preseason catching eight passes for 222 yards and two touchdowns. However, Clowney injured his collar bone, and didn't have his first career NFL reception until Week 15 against the Buffalo Bills, when he had a one-handed catch that went for 26 yards from Brett Favre

2009 Season 
Clowney caught 14 passes for 191 yards. He had 1 touchdown catch.

2010 
The Jets waived Clowney on September 5, 2010. Clowney was immediately re-signed by the team on September 14, 2010 following their Week One matchup against the Baltimore Ravens.

Clowney, along with teammate Patrick Turner, were released on October 4, 2010, to make room for defensive tackle Howard Green and wide receiver Santonio Holmes, who was returning from a four-game suspension.

Carolina Panthers 
Clowney was claimed off waivers by the Carolina Panthers on October 5, 2010. Where he started the next 4 games with Steve Smith being injured.

Buffalo Bills 
On January 5, 2012 Clowney signed a future contract with the Buffalo Bills, the contract saw Clowney earn $700,000 in 2012.

Montreal Alouettes 
Clowney was signed by Montreal Alouettes of the (CFL) Canadian Football League. He suffered a neck injury on June 13, 2013 at a pre-season game against Hamilton Tiger Cats and was placed on 9 game injured reserve list.

Regular season statistics

References

External links 
Official Website

Just Sports Stats
New York Jets bio
2006 Virginia Tech Hokies bio
Montreal Alouettes

1985 births
Living people
African-American players of American football
American football wide receivers
Carolina Panthers players
Green Bay Packers players
Montreal Alouettes players
New York Jets players
People from Amityville, New York
Players of American football from New York (state)
Sportspeople from Delray Beach, Florida
Sportspeople from Suffolk County, New York
Virginia Tech Hokies football players
21st-century African-American sportspeople
20th-century African-American people